C. J. Brewer may refer to:

C. J. Brewer (defensive tackle) (born 1997), American football player
C. J. Brewer (wide receiver) (born 1982), American football player